Berhoum is a town and commune in M'Sila Province, Algeria. According to the 1998 census it has a population of 17,838.

References

Communes of M'Sila Province